Blue Ash is a city in Hamilton County, Ohio. An inner suburb of Cincinnati, the population was 13,394 at the time of the 2020 census.

History
The area that is now Blue Ash was settled around 1791. In 1797, the first settlers built Carpenter's Run Baptist Church out of blue ash logs, giving the area its eventual name.

In the late 19th century, the Cincinnati, Lebanon and Northern Railway provided narrow gauge commuter rail service to Blue Ash.

Blue Ash was the site of Cincinnati–Blue Ash Airport from 1921 to 2012. Originally a private airfield called Grisard Field, it was sold to the City of Cincinnati in 1946, becoming Ohio's first municipal airport. Cincinnati desired to expand the airport for major commercial service through the 1950s, but Blue Ash fought the city by incorporating first as a village in 1955 and then as a city in 1961. Eventually, through Reed Hartman's Community Improvement Corporation, Cincinnati developed the surrounding area as an industrial park and golf course. The airport closed on August 29, 2012, and the property was sold to the City of Blue Ash, which opened Summit Park on the property.

In 1998, the Southwest Ohio Regional Transit Authority proposed a MetroMoves light rail system with a Green Line that would initially run  from Blue Ash to Covington, Kentucky. A future phase would have extended the line further north to Kings Island and south to the Cincinnati/Northern Kentucky International Airport. However, MetroMoves was rejected by Hamilton County voters.

On April 9, 1999, Blue Ash experienced an F4 tornado that caused four deaths.

Geography
Blue Ash is located at  (39.247109, -84.376038).

Blue Ash can be reached by Interstate 71 to the east, Interstate 275 to the north, and Ronald Reagan Cross County Highway to the south.

Demographics

2020 census
As of the census of 2020, there were 13,394 people and 5,851 households residing in the city. The racial makeup of the city was 74.0% White, 6.6% African American, 0.2% Native American, 13.2% Asian, 1.4% from other races, and 6.0% from two or more races. Hispanic or Latino of any race were 3.8% of the population.

2010 census
As of the census of 2010, there were 12,114 people, 5,015 households, and 3,404 families residing in the city. The racial makeup of the city was 79.9% White, 6.5% African American, 0.2% Native American, 10.6% Asian, 0.6% from other races, and 2.1% from two or more races. Hispanic or Latino of any race were 2.5% of the population.

There were 5,015 households, of which 31.1% had children under the age of 18 living with them, 53.7% were married couples living together, 10.4% had a female householder with no husband present, 3.8% had a male householder with no wife present, and 32.1% were non-families. 26.7% of all households were made up of individuals, and 10.3% had someone living alone who was 65 years of age or older. The average household size was 2.40 and the average family size was 2.91.

The median age in the city was 41.6 years. 22.7% of residents were under the age of 18; 6.6% were between the ages of 18 and 24; 24.8% were from 25 to 44; 30.6% were from 45 to 64; and 15.4% were 65 years of age or older. The gender makeup of the city was 49.0% male and 51.0% female.

2000 census
As of the census of 2000, there were 12,513 people, 4,990 households, and 3,468 families residing in the city. The population density was 1,634.6 people per square mile (630.7/km2). There were 5,251 housing units at an average density of 686.0 per square mile (264.7/km2). The racial makeup of the city was 87.09% White, 5.01% African American, 0.25% Native American, 6.39% Asian, 0.02% Pacific Islander, 0.29% from other races, and 0.96% from two or more races. Hispanic or Latino of any race were 0.97% of the population.

There were 4,990 households, out of which 32.7% had children under the age of 18 living with them, 57.2% were married couples living together, 9.4% had a female householder with no husband present, and 30.5% were non-families. 25.3% of all households were made up of individuals, and 8.4% had someone living alone who was 65 years of age or older. The average household size was 2.48 and the average family size was 3.01.

In the city the population was spread out, with 25.4% under the age of 18, 6.4% from 18 to 24, 27.8% from 25 to 44, 26.1% from 45 to 64, and 14.2% who were 65 years of age or older. The median age was 39 years. For every 100 females, there were 93.7 males. For every 100 females age 18 and over, there were 91.0 males.

The median income for a household in the city was $81,591, and the median income for a family was $88,494. Males had a median income of $72,743 versus $65,060 for females. The per capita income for the city was $63,801. About 3.8% of families and 4.7% of the population were below the poverty line, including 6.8% of those under age 18 and 2.9% of those age 65 or over.

Education
Blue Ash is mostly served by the Sycamore Community School District, which has had the most National Merit Scholars of any public school in Ohio for the past four years and has been given the highest rating of "Excellent" by the Ohio Department of Education for eight consecutive years. The Princeton City School District covers a western portion of the city. Moeller High School, located just outside the city limits, is a Catholic private high school for boys, while Ursuline Academy is a Catholic independent high school for girls. Blue Ash is also home to UC Blue Ash, formally called Raymond Walters College, a satellite campus of University of Cincinnati.

Blue Ash is served by a branch of the Public Library of Cincinnati and Hamilton County.

Culture
Blue Ash offers two summer events each year: "Red, White, and Blue Ash"; and "Taste of Blue Ash". "Red, White and Blue Ash" is held annually in celebration of the 4th of July and features the biggest Independence Day firework display in the region. These events draw internationally popular headlining rock acts. On July 4, 2010, the bands Yes and Peter Frampton drew a record estimated 150,000 people to that year's Red, White, and Blue Ash event. Due to budget constraints the city decided to suspend their "Summerbration" event for 2010–2013, with hopes to resume the event in the near future.

Blue Ash and the neighboring city of Montgomery partner to support the Blue Ash Montgomery Symphony Orchestra, which performs at local events. In addition, the City provides an annual Concert Series each year during the summer months.

Blue Ash is a sister city of Ilmenau in Germany.

Economy
Blue Ash's "daytime population" reaches approximately 55,000 due to the 2,000 businesses within the city limits. The city's industrial and commercial parks are home to many corporate headquarters, including:

Belcan Corporation, an engineering consulting firm
Citigroup (North American Information Technology Division)
Ethicon Endo-Surgery, a medical device manufacturer
F+W
The J. Peterman Company, moved its headquarters to Blue Ash in 2011
Milacron
Sunny Delight Beverages, manufacturer of Sunny Delight
Apollo Integrated Systems, High definition electronic frequency locking equipment designer
Kroger Technology, headquartered here and with two facilities here, is the technology and computer system management division of the Kroger supermarket corporation, headquartered in nearby Cincinnati.

Notable people
Malar Balasubramanian, pediatrician charged with involuntary manslaughter
William F. Brown, welding engineer
Joseph Crane Hartzell, Missionary Bishop of the Methodist Episcopal Church
Mark P. Painter, state appellate judge, United Nations appellate judge
Amy Yasbeck, film and television actress, Wings

References

External links

 City website
 Blue Ash Events

 
Cities in Ohio
Cities in Hamilton County, Ohio
1791 establishments in the United States